Amebucort (developmental code name ZK-90999) is a synthetic glucocorticoid corticosteroid which was never marketed.

References

Acetate esters
Triketones
Glucocorticoids
Pregnanes
Diols
Abandoned drugs